Perfect Life may refer to:

 Perfect Life (Levinhurst album), 2004
 Perfect Life (Yoga Lin album), 2011
 "Perfect Life" (Levina song), 2017
 "Perfect Life", a song by Red from Release the Panic
 Perfect Life (film), a 2008 Chinese-Hong Kong film by Emily Tang
 The Perfect Life, a 2011 Italian comedy film
 Perfect Life (TV series), Spanish TV series (2019–).